Frontier Middle School may refer to:

 Frontier Middle School, the middle school of the Frontier Central School District in Hamburg, New York
 Frontier Middle School in Natrona County School District Number 1, Casper, Wyoming
Frontier Middle School in the Wentzville R-IV School District, O'fallon, Missouri

Disambiguation pages